Little Big Town is the debut studio album by country music group Little Big Town. Released in 2002 on Monument Records, the album produced two singles for the group on the Hot Country Songs charts: "Don't Waste My Time" and "Everything Changes", which respectively reached number 33 and number 42 on the Billboard Hot Country Songs charts. "Stay" was re-recorded for the group's second album, The Road to Here.

The group co-produced the album with Blake Chancey, with further production from Paul Worley on tracks 1, 4, and 10.

Track listing

Personnel

Little Big Town
Karen Fairchild- vocals
Kimberly Roads- vocals
Phillip Sweet- vocals, acoustic guitar
Jimi Westbrook- vocals

Additional Musicians

 Gary Burnette - electric guitar
 Matt Chamberlain - drums
 Mark Childers - bass guitar
 Dave Cleveland - 12-string guitar, acoustic guitar, mandolin
 Dan Dugmore - dobro, electric guitar, steel guitar
 Tony Harrell - keyboards, Hammond organ, Wurlitzer
 Aubrey Haynie - fiddle, mandolin
 David Huff - drums, electric guitar, percussion, programming
 Kirk "Jelly Roll" Johnson - harmonica
 Jerry McPherson - electric guitar
 Steve Nathan - keyboards
 Craig Nelson - bass guitar, string bass
 Billy Panda - acoustic guitar
 Darrell Scott - bouzouki, 12-string guitar, acoustic guitar
 Jimmie Lee Sloas - bass guitar
 Paul Worley - acoustic guitar, electric guitar, slide guitar
 Jonathan Yudkin - cello, mandolin, viola, violin

Chart performance

Album

References

2002 debut albums
Little Big Town albums
Monument Records albums
Albums produced by Blake Chancey